Bennetot is a former commune in the Seine-Maritime department in the Normandy region in northern France. On 1 January 2017, it was merged into the new commune Terres-de-Caux.

Geography

Heraldry

Population

Places of interest
 The church of St. André, dating from the seventeenth century.
 A sixteenth century manorhouse

Notable people
 Réné-Aubert Vertot, French historian, was born here on the 25th Nov 1655.

See also
Communes of the Seine-Maritime department

References

Former communes of Seine-Maritime